Notable things that happened in Ireland in 1555.

Incumbent
Monarch: Mary I

Events
William Annyas becomes the mayor of Youghal in County Cork, the first Jewish Mayor in Ireland.
 Pope Paul IV issues a Papal Bull recognising Philip II of Spain and Mary I of England as rightful King and Queen of Ireland.

Arts and literature

Births

Deaths

References 

 
1550s in Ireland
Ireland
Years of the 16th century in Ireland